Frierson is a surname. Notable persons with that name include:

Andrew Frierson (born 1929), American operatic tenor
Buck Frierson (1917–1996), American baseball player
Eddie Frierson (born 1959), American actor
Herbert Frierson (born 1958), American politician
Jason Frierson (born 1970), American politician
Leon Frierson (born 1986), American actor
Trina Frierson (born 1979), American basketball player
William L. Frierson (1868–1953), American lawyer, judge and politician
William Frierson Cooper (1820–1909), American lawyer, planter and politician

See also
Frierson, Louisiana, an unincorporated community and census-designated place (CDP) in DeSoto Parish, Louisiana, United States
Frierson House, a historic house at 1112 South Main Street in Jonesboro, Arkansas